Northern Dobruja ( or simply ; , Severna Dobrudzha) is the part of Dobruja within the borders of Romania. It lies between the lower Danube River and the Black Sea, bordered in the south by Southern Dobruja, which is a part of Bulgaria.

History

Around 600 BC, the Greeks colonized the Black Sea shore and founded numerous fortresses: Tomis (today's Constanta), Callatis, Histria, Argamum, Heracleea, Aegysus. Greeks have commerce with dacians who lived there on main land. Dobruja became a Roman province after conquest of Dacian Tribes. One of the best preserved remnants of this period is the Capidava citadel.

Between the 7th and 14th century, Dobruja was part of the First Bulgarian Empire and the Second Bulgarian Empire.

For a long period in the 14-15th century, Dobruja became part of Wallachia. The territory fell under Ottoman rule from the mid-15th century until 1878, when it was awarded to Romania for its role in the 1877-78 Russo-Turkish War, and as compensation for the transfer of a region partly overlapping Southern Bessarabia. Under the treaties of San Stefano and Berlin, Romania received Northern Dobruja while the newly restored Principality of Bulgaria received the smaller southern part of the region. After the Second Balkan War in 1913, Romania also annexed the Bulgarian Southern Dobruja, which it ruled until the signing of the 1940 Treaty of Craiova. The treaty was approved by Britain, Vichy France, Germany, Italy, the Soviet Union and the United States. It included a population exchange which removed the Bulgarian minority from Northern Dobruja, which was evacuated to the southern part. At the same time, the Romanians (including Aromanians and Megleno-Romanians) from Southern Dobruja were brought north of the border. There also is a Csángó Hungarian village in Northern Dobruja, in the Constanța County, known as Oituz.

Geography
The territory of Northern Dobruja now forms the counties of Constanța and Tulcea, with a total area of 15,570 km2 and a current population of slightly under 900,000.

Cities
Constanța
Tulcea
Medgidia
Mangalia

Rivers
Casimcea
Slava
Taița
Telița

Lakes
Crapina Lake
Jijiei Lake
Traian Lake
Babadag Lake
Razim Lake
Zmeica Lake
Sinoe Lake
Tașaul Lake
Techirghiol Lake

Danube Delta

The Danube Delta consists of numerous lakes. The most important ones are:
Roșu
Isac
Gorgova
Furtuna
Ledeanca
Tatanir
Merhel
Matița
Uzlina
Dranov
Lumina
Puiu
Puiuleț

Demographics

Ethnic composition

The table below shows Romanian statistics throughout the years:

1According to the 1926–1938 Romanian administrative division (counties of Constanța and Tulcea), which excluded a part of today's Romania (chiefly the communes of Ostrov and Lipnița, now part of Constanța County) and included a part of today's Bulgaria (parts of General Toshevo and Krushari municipalities)
2Only Russians. (Russians and Lipovans counted separately)

Symbols

Northern Dobruja is represented by two dolphins in the Coat of arms of Romania.

Starting with 2015, Romania observes Dobruja Day on November 14, marking the 1878 incorporation of Northern Dobruja into the Kingdom of Romania after the Treaty of Berlin.

References

Historical regions in Romania